The JMG Academy is a sports organisation and training company established by French international football player Jean-Marc Guillou.

Overview 
Guillou had established Académie de Sol Beni in Abidjan in 1994 via a partnership with ASEC Mimosas. JMG Academy was established in 2002 following a disagreement between Guillou and ASEC over control of the Academy.

The success of the academy in Abidjan saw JMG expand into other parts of the world.

Locations

The company has nine academies throughout the world: Ivory Coast from 1994; Madagascar from 2000; Thailand from 2005; Mali from 2006; Algeria (in partnership with Paradou AC), Egypt, and Vietnam from 2007; Ghana from 2008.

The projects in Egypt, Thailand and Vietnam have all been assisted by Arsenal.

Notable players 

  Blankson Anoff
  Nene Dorgeles
  Jason Denayer
  Khalil Lambin
  Salis Abdul Samed
  Ramy Bensebaini
  Youcef Atal

References

External links
JMG Football, académies de football Jean-Marc Guillou 
web archives of old Academie JMG website 

JMG Academy
Education companies established in 2002
Sports organizations of France
Training companies of Europe
Football academies in Africa
Football academies in Asia
Football in Vietnam
Football in Thailand
2002 establishments in France